Alvin Addison Bodine (October 30, 1927 – August 31, 2020) was a Canadian football player who played for the Saskatchewan Roughriders. He played college football at the University of Georgia.

References

1927 births
2020 deaths
Saskatchewan Roughriders players